Nguyễn Văn Hoàng  (born 17 February 1995) is a Vietnamese footballer who plays as a goalkeeper for V.League 1 club Sông Lam Nghệ An and Vietnam national football team.

M-150 Cup
Văn Hoàng was included in Vietnam U23 squad for the M-150 Cup at Thailand

Honours
Vietnam U23 
AFC U-23 Championship Runners-up  2018

External links

References

1995 births
Living people
Saigon FC players
V.League 1 players
Vietnamese footballers
Association football goalkeepers
Footballers at the 2018 Asian Games
Asian Games competitors for Vietnam
People from Nghệ An province